Marie Herping (born 18 March 1984) is a Danish former football striker who played for OB Odense, Fortuna Hjørring and the Danish national team.

References
Danish Football Union (DBU) statistics

1984 births
Living people
Danish women's footballers
Denmark women's international footballers
Fortuna Hjørring players
Odense Q players
Women's association football forwards